The Show-Off is a 1924 stage play written by George Kelly.

The Show-Off may also refer to the following film adaptations:

 The Show-Off (1926 film)
 The Show-Off (1934 film)
 The Show-Off (1946 film)

See also
Men Are Like That, 1930